Paul Dillingham Jr. (August 10, 1799 – July 26, 1891) was an American lawyer and politician.  He served as a U.S. Representative from Vermont, the 24th lieutenant governor of Vermont from 1862 to 1865, and the 29th governor of Vermont from 1865 to 1867.

Early life
Dillingham was born in Shutesbury, Massachusetts, on August 10, 1799, a son of Paul Dillingham Sr. and Hannah (Smith) Dillingham.  The Dillingham family moved to Waterbury, Vermont in 1805, where Dillingham worked on the family farm and attended the district school in Waterbury and Montpelier's Washington County Grammar School.  In 1820, he commenced studying law in the office of Judge Daniel Carpenter.  He was admitted to the bar in March 1823, and in April he began to practice in Waterbury as Carpenter's partner.  He gained a reputation throughout Vermont as a skilled trial lawyer with a superior ability to present oral arguments to judges and juries.

Early career
Entering politics as a Democrat, Dillingham served as a Waterbury justice of the peace from 1826 to 1844, and town clerk from 1829 to 1844.  He served as Waterbury's member of the Vermont House of Representatives from 1833 to 1835, as State's Attorney of Washington County from 1835 to 1839, and again as Waterbury's member of the Vermont House from 1837 to 1840.  Dillingham served as a delegate to the State constitutional convention of 1836, and a member of the Vermont State Senate in 1841 and 1842.

Congressman

He was not a candidate for renomination in 1846. During Dillingham's House service, he served on the Judiciary Committee and the Committee on Claims. The only Democrat in Vermont's Congressional delegation, he favored the annexation of Texas and supported US involvement in the Mexican-American War.

Dillingham was a delegate to the 1857 State constitutional convention.  In 1861, Dillingham served again in the Vermont Senate.

Lieutenant governor
Increasingly opposed to slavery and secession, Dillingham declined the Democratic Party's 1860 nomination for governor.  When the American Civil War started, he officially changed his allegiance from Democratic to Republican.  He served as the lieutenant governor from 1862 to 1865.  Holding office at the height of the war, Dillingham's efforts were focused on aiding governors Frederick Holbrook and J. Gregory Smith to obtain passage of laws for raising, paying, and equipping soldiers for the Union Army.  In addition, he campaigned throughout Vermont for the Republican (Unionist) ticket of Abraham Lincoln and Andrew Johnson in the 1864 United States presidential election.

Governor
Dillingham served as the 29th governor of Vermont from 1865 to 1867.  As governor, he created Vermont's first reform school and established Vermont's first normal school for teacher training (now Vermont Technical College).  It also fell to Dillingham to appoint two members of the U.S. Senate to replace senators who had died.  To succeed Jacob Collamer, Dillingham selected Luke P. Poland.  To replace Solomon Foot, Dillingham first offered the appointment to former governor J. Gregory Smith.  When Smith declined, Dillingham selected George F. Edmunds.

Later life
He resumed the practice of law, and was a delegate to the State constitutional convention in 1870.  He retired in 1875.

Death and burial
Dillingham died at his home in Waterbury on July 26, 1891.  He is interred in the Village Cemetery in Waterbury.

Family
He married Sarah Partridge Carpenter, a daughter of Daniel Carpenter.  She died on September 20, 1831, and on September 5, 1832, Dillingham married Sarah's sister Julia.  He had seven children who lived to adulthood, including William Paul Dillingham, who served as governor and U.S. Senator.  Dillingham was also the father in law of Senator Matthew H. Carpenter.

References

External links

Paul Dillingham at The Political Graveyard
Paul Dillingham at National Governors Association

1799 births
1891 deaths
Members of the Vermont House of Representatives
Vermont state senators
Vermont Republicans
Lieutenant Governors of Vermont
Governors of Vermont
Vermont lawyers
People from Waterbury, Vermont
Democratic Party members of the United States House of Representatives from Vermont
Republican Party governors of Vermont
19th-century American politicians
People from Shutesbury, Massachusetts
State's attorneys in Vermont
19th-century American lawyers